Kuancheng Manchu Autonomous County ([Möllendorff: kuwanceng manju beye dasangga siyan) is a Manchu autonomous county of northeastern Hebei province, China, on the banks of the Luan River, bordering Liaoning to the east.

Administrative divisions
There are 7 towns and 11 townships under the county's administration.

Towns:

Kuancheng
Longxumen
Yu'erya
Bancheng
Tangdaohe
Boluotai
Nianziyu

Townships:

Huapiliuzi Township
Tashan Township
Mengziling Township
Dushigou Township
Dongdadi Township
Huajian Township
Donghuanghuachuan Township
Liangjiatai Township
Weizigou Township
Dazigoumen Township
Dashizhuzi Township

Climate

References

Manchu autonomous counties
County-level divisions of Hebei
Chengde